Mia Audina Tjiptawan (born 22 August 1979) is a former Indonesian badminton player who represented Indonesia and later the Netherlands in international competitions. A badminton prodigy, Audina first played Uber Cup (the women's world team championship) for Indonesia at age fourteen, winning the decisive final match in the championship round against China in 1994. She was briefly ranked as the World No.1 women's singles player in October 1996. Audina helped Indonesia to retain the Uber Cup title in 1996, and was a member of the 1998 Indonesian team which relinquished the Cup to China, before moving to the Netherlands with her Dutch-national husband in 2000.

Career 
As a Dutch resident she continued to compete, winning titles in both Europe and Asia before retiring from high-level competition in 2006. Top honors in badminton's three most prestigious events for individual players, the Olympics, the All-Englands, and the World Championships, eluded Audina, though she was twice an Olympic silver medalist in singles (1996, 2004) and was a bronze medalist at the World Championships in 2003. Her most significant victories included the open singles titles of the USA (1996), Singapore (1997), Japan (1997, 2004), Indonesia (1998), Korea (2003), the Netherlands (2001, 2002), Switzerland (2002), and Taiwan (2000, 2003). She won singles at the Southeast Asian Games in 1997 and both singles and women's doubles at the European Championships in 2004. A gritty competitor and, in her youth, exceptionally mobile and supple (she was rarely forced into hitting backhands), Audina was a crowd favorite throughout her career.

Achievements

Olympic Games 
Women's singles

World Championships 
Women's singles

World Cup 
Women's singles

European Championships 
Women's singles

Women's doubles

Asian Cup 
Women's singles

Southeast Asian Games 
Women's singles

World Junior Championships 
Girls' singles

Girls' doubles

IBF World Grand Prix
The World Badminton Grand Prix has been sanctioned by the International Badminton Federation from 1983 to 2006.

Women's singles

Women's doubles

IBF International 
Women's singles

Women's doubles

Record against selected opponents 
Record against year-end Finals finalists, World Championships semi-finalists, and Olympic quarter-finalists.

References

Bibliography

External links
 
 
 
 

1979 births
Living people
Sportspeople from Jakarta
Indonesian sportspeople of Chinese descent
Indonesian female badminton players
Badminton players at the 1996 Summer Olympics
Badminton players at the 2000 Summer Olympics
Olympic badminton players of Indonesia
Olympic silver medalists for Indonesia
Olympic medalists in badminton
Medalists at the 1996 Summer Olympics
Badminton players at the 1998 Asian Games
Asian Games bronze medalists for Indonesia
Asian Games medalists in badminton
Medalists at the 1998 Asian Games
Competitors at the 1997 Southeast Asian Games
Southeast Asian Games gold medalists for Indonesia
Southeast Asian Games medalists in badminton
Indonesian emigrants to the Netherlands
Indonesian expatriate sportspeople in the Netherlands
Sportspeople from Rotterdam
Dutch female badminton players
Badminton players at the 2004 Summer Olympics
Olympic badminton players of the Netherlands
Olympic silver medalists for the Netherlands
Medalists at the 2004 Summer Olympics
World No. 1 badminton players